Shahidan may refer to:
 Shahidan, Fars
 Shahidan, Gilan
 Shahidan, Sistan and Baluchestan